Dorian Tristan Lough (born 27 April 1966 in Kensington, London) is an English actor who appeared as DS Dave Satchell in Trial & Retribution. He has also played Ray Taylor in EastEnders. Lough is also known for starring in the music video for the Radiohead song "Just".

Partial filmography
The Last Kingdom (2020)
New Blood DI Martin Heywood (2016)
The Tunnel Captain Paul Spencer (2016)
Cradle to Grave Orrie (2015)
Jonathan Strange & Mr Norrell Hyde (2015)
The Smoke Billy "Mince" (2014)
New Tricks Stuart McKelvie (2013)
Southcliffe Commanding Officer (2013)
Mrs Biggs Paul Seabourne (2012)
Het Goddelijke Monster (Belgian tv-series) Mister Hoffman (2011)
Skins Leon Levan (2011)
Ashes to Ashes Lafferty (2009) 
EastEnders Ray Taylor (2005)
Charles II: The Power and The Passion Clifford (2003)
Lucky Jim Taxi Driver (2003)
The Low Down Squash Player (2000)
The Last Musketeer Tel Fletcher (2000)
The Bill  DS Glen Perrett (2000)
Notting Hill Loud Man in Restaurant (1999)
Trial & Retribution DS Dave Satchell (1997-2009)
The Wave Alex (1997)

External links
 

1966 births
English male soap opera actors
20th-century English male actors
21st-century English male actors
Living people
Male actors from London
People from Kensington